The Europa Shield was an annual korfball club competition run by the International Korfball Federation from 2001 till 2020. Clubs qualified for this competition based on their performance in their national leagues. Included were the second and third classified for the "B" countries and the first classified for "C" countries. It was the second-tier competition of European korfball clubs, ranking below the Europa Cup. In January 2022, the IKF announced that the IKF Europa Cup and IKF Europa Shield would be replaced by the IKF Europe Korfball Champions League for the 2022-23 Season.

Results

Alltime club ranking

Alltime country ranking

Europa Shield standings

References

External links 
Europa Shield at IKF website

European Shield
European international sports competitions
Korfball in Europe
2001 establishments in Europe
Recurring sporting events established in 2001
Multi-national professional sports leagues